Mahmud Pasha (died 1567) was an Ottoman statesman from Bosnia who served as the Ottoman governor of Yemen Eyalet from 1561 to 1565 until being deposed, and of Egypt Eyalet from 1566 until his assassination by gunfire in 1567.

He was described as an "unscrupulous," corrupt, but wealthy official with "the riches of the al-Nazaris in his possession." He reportedly disliked his successor for the governorship of Yemen, Ridwan Pasha, and purposefully made his job harder with actions he took just before his removal from office.

As the governor of Egypt, Mahmud Pasha had the Al-Mahmoudia Mosque built in Cairo, which still stands today.

See also
 List of Ottoman governors of Egypt

References

Ottoman governors of Egypt
16th-century Ottoman governors of Egypt
Pashas
1567 deaths
Year of birth unknown
Ottoman governors of Yemen
Assassinated people from the Ottoman Empire